César Augusto Munder Rodríguez (born 7 January 2000) is a Cuban-born Chilean professional footballer who plays as a forward for Chilean club Cobresal, on loan from Universidad Católica.

International career
He made an appearance for Chile U23 in a friendly match against Brazil U23 on September 9, 2019 by replacing Iván Morales.

Personal life
Born in La Habana, Cuba, on 2012 he made a short-term trip to Chile to meet his father, who is a Cuban former municipal civil servant living in Chile and is married to a Chilean woman. After returning to Cuba along with his mother, he arrived permanently to Chile at the age of 14 and joined Universidad Católica. Later, he acquired Chilean nationality on April 24, 2019.

Honours

Club
Universidad Católica
 Primera División (3): 2018, 2019, 2020
 Supercopa de Chile (1): 2019
 Friendlies (1): Torneo de Verano Fox Sports 2019

Career statistics

Club

Notes

References

External links
 

2000 births
Living people
Sportspeople from Havana
Cuban footballers
Cuban expatriate footballers
Naturalized citizens of Chile
Chilean footballers
Club Deportivo Universidad Católica footballers
Deportes La Serena footballers
cobresal footballers
Chilean Primera División players
Expatriate footballers in Chile
Cuban expatriate sportspeople in Chile
Association football forwards
Chilean people of Cuban descent